Dendrobium brachypus, commonly known as the dwarf cane orchid, is an epiphytic or lithophytic orchid in the family Orchidaceae. It has crowded, yellowish green pseudobulbs, dark green leaves and two or three cream-coloured to whitish or greenish flowers which often do not open fully. It grows on trees and rocks on one mountain on Norfolk Island.

Description
Flowering occurs between August and October.

Taxonomy and naming
The Norfolk Island orchid was first formally described in 1833 by Stephan Endlicher who gave it the name Thelychiton brachypus and published the description in Prodromus Florae Norfolkicae. In 1877 Heinrich Gustav Reichenbach changed the name to Dendrobium brachypus.  The specific epithet (brachypus) is derived from ancient Greek words meaning "short"  and "foot", alluding to the relatively short pseudobulbs of this orchid, in contrast to those of Dendrobium macropus, described by Endlicher in the same publication.

Distribution and habitat
Dendrobium brachypus is endemic to the Australian external territory of Norfolk Island in the Tasman Sea, where it grows on rocks and trees in forest on the slopes of Mount Pitt.

Conservation
This orchid is rare and listed as endangered under Australia's Environment Protection and Biodiversity Conservation Act 1999 (EPBC Act).

References

brachypus
Endemic orchids of Australia
Flora of Norfolk Island
Epiphytic orchids
Plants described in 1833
Endangered flora of Australia